The Palace Theatre (ca.1891-1931) of Boston, Massachusetts was a variety theatre on Court Street in the late 19th and early 20th centuries. Acts which performed there included Rose Hill Folly Co., Clifford & Dixon, Murry & Murry, Behler & Stone, and the Adamless Eden Burlesquers. It also showed photo-plays such as The Exploits of Elaine, The Master Key, and "Charles Chaplin comedies." Among its managers and proprietors were William Austin, F. J. Pilling, George Milbank, and Dunn & Waldron. The Palace occupied the building of the former Nickelodeon. It existed until 1931, when it was demolished.

Images

References

External links

 Boston Athenaeum. Theater History: Austin's Palace Theatre (ca. 1891-1897), 109 Court Street

Demolished buildings and structures in Boston
Cultural history of Boston
Former theatres in Boston
Government Center, Boston
1891 establishments in Massachusetts
1931 disestablishments in Massachusetts
Event venues established in 1891
20th century in Boston
Former cinemas in the United States
Burlesque theatres
Buildings and structures demolished in 1931